Nandish Sandhu (born 25 December 1981) is an Indian actor, model and producer. Predominantly known for his television roles, he began his career with modelling. He made his television debut playing Raunak Sabharwal in the successful show Kasturi (2007) but gained immense popularity and became a household name with his award-winning portrayal as Veer Singh Bundela in the long running soap opera Uttaran (2009-2012).

Sandhu post Uttaran enacted several other roles such as Aditya in the television series Phir Subah Hogi (2012), Rehan Habeeb Khan in television serial Beintehaa (2013) and  Inspector Sartaj Quereshi in Encounter (2014). He also participated along with his wife Rashami Desai as a contestant in the reality shows Fear Factor: Khatron Ke Khiladi 6 (2015) and Nach Baliye (2015), finishing up as the first runner-up in the lattermost. He also appearances in episodic roles in television series such as Ssshhhh...Phir Koi Hai (2007), Darr Sabko Lagta Hai (2015) and Raaz Pichhle Janam Ka (2009).

He made his official film debut in 2019 with the real-life character of Pranav Kumar in Hrithik Roshan starrer biographical drama Super 30, that emerged as a major box office hit. He then starred in Family of Thakurganj (2019) in the role of Munnu, co-starring Saurabh Shukla, Jimmy Shergill, Mahie Gill in lead. It was directed by Manoj Jha.

Career

2007-2015 Television Roles
Sandhu started his career with modelling. In 2007, he made his acting debut in the television show with Star Plus's Kasturi, where he played Raunak. and afterwards he appeared in several TV shows, where he played supporting role and cameo role.

In 2009, His first major breakthrough and official debut occurred in TV with the role of Veer Singh Bundela opposite Tina Dutta in Colors TV's Uttaran. It was his portrayal of Veer which garnered him household name and fame, earned widespread recognition and popularity, including several awards and nominations. Uttaran opened up newer international markets for Indian Television, The ratings of the show increased after his entry and his chemistry with Tina Datta was also highly applauded. He quit the show in 2012, when the show took 18 years leap.

In 2012, Sandhu featured in Zee TV's Phir Subah Hogi. In 2014, Sandhu played Lawyer Rehaan in Colors TV's Beintehaa. In 2015, he participated in Colors TV's stunt-action show Fear Factor: Khatron Ke Khiladi 6 which was hosted by director Rohit Shetty and reached the semifinals. In the same year, he participated (along with his then-wife Rashami Desai) in the Star Plus's dance reality show Nach Baliye 7 emerging as runner-up.

Producing short films
He turn manufacturers by producing a short film in 2016 named Girl in Red, he also acted in it. It was directed by Saurabh Verma. Girl in Red is now also available on MX Player, the film holds an average rating of 6.3 out of 10 based on 15 reviews. Girl in red received mixed reviews by critics; Rahul of Film Companion says Saurabh Varma's short about a chain-smoking author battling a writer's block isn't a bad film. But often, this averageness is more disappointing because of what could have been. Then again in 2017, he co-produced another short film named The Gift starring Gul Panag, Kushal Punjabi and Mandira Bedi in lead, it's available on the streaming app Sony LIV since it is released.

(2016-present) Started appearing in films and web series
In 2019, Sandhu was cast alongside Hrithik Roshan in Bollywood biopic movie Super 30 he played the role of Pranav Kumar, a brother of Anand Kumar. The film was released to commercial success, but received mixed reviews. He also starred in the 2019 movie Family of Thakurganj which was directed by Manoj Jha and written by Dilip Shukla. The film also starred Jimmy Shergill, Mahie Gill and Saurabh Shukla in key roles.

In 2021, Nandish played a supporting role in the Hotstar original series titled Grahan in the role of Kartik. The series starred Pawan Malhotra, Zoya Hussain, Wamiqa Gabbi and Anshumaan Pushkar in lead roles.

Personal life
Sandhu married his Uttaran co-star Rashami Desai on 12 February 2012 in Dholpur. In 2014, they announced their separation and they got divorced in 2015.

Filmography

Films

Web series

Television

Music videos

Awards & Nominations

References

External links

 

1981 births
Living people
Indian male models
Indian male television actors
Indian male soap opera actors
People from Bharatpur district
Male actors from Rajasthan
Fear Factor: Khatron Ke Khiladi participants